Norman Herbert was an English former professional rugby league footballer who played in the 1960s.

Playing career

International honours
Norman Herbert won a cap for England while at Workington in 1962 against France, and won caps for Great Britain while at Workington in 1961 against New Zealand, and in 1962 against France, Australia (3 matches), and New Zealand.

Challenge Cup Final appearances
Norman Herbert played left-, i.e. number 8, in Workington Town's 9–13 defeat by Wigan in the 1958 Challenge Cup Final during the 1957–58 season at Wembley Stadium, London on Saturday 10 May 1958.

References

External links
(archived by web.archive.org) Workington and Hull KR triumph in the regions
30 April 1955 Photograph of Workington Town

1934 births
2022 deaths
England national rugby league team players
English rugby league players
Great Britain national rugby league team players
Place of birth missing (living people)
Rugby league props
Workington Town players
Year of birth missing (living people)